Dan Hultmark is a Swedish biologist currently Professor Emeritus, whose research focused on the mechanisms of innate immunity, using Drosophila as a model system, at Umeå University and an Elected Fellow of the American Association for the Advancement of Science. Hultmark is also a member of the Drosophila 12 Genomes Consortium, Tribolium Genome Sequencing Consortium.

Awards and honors 
Hultmark received the Flormanska belöningen of the Royal Swedish Academy of Sciences (1994) and the Göran Gustafsson Prize in Molecular Biology (1996). He  is a Distinguished Fellow of the American Association for The Advancement of Science section of biological sciences since 2007. Between 2009 and 2013 Hultmark was invited by the Academy of Finland to the Institute of Medical Technology, University of Tampere as a Finland Distinguished Professor.

Publications (selected)

Book 

 Brey, Hultmark (Eds), Molecular mechanism of immune responses in insects London: Chapman & Hall, 1998. ISBN 9780412712807

Peer-reviewed journals 

 Boman HG, Hultmark D. Cell-free immunity in insects. Annu Rev Microbiol. 1987;41:103-26. doi: 10.1146/annurev.mi.41.100187.000535. PMID 3318666.
 Little TJ, Hultmark D, Read AF. Invertebrate immunity and the limits of mechanistic immunology. Nat Immunol. 2005 Jul;6(7):651-4. doi: 10.1038/ni1219. PMID 15970937.
 Sackton TB, Lazzaro BP, Schlenke TA, Evans JD, Hultmark D, Clark AG., Dynamic evolution of the innate immune system in Drosophila. In: Nature Genetics 39, No. 12 (2007) 1461-1468 doi: 10.1038/ng.2007.60. PMID 17987029 
 Anderl I, Hultmark D. New ways to make a blood cell. Elife. 2015 Mar 12;4:e06877. doi: 10.7554/eLife.06877. PMID 25764304; PMCID: PMC4357284.
 Yang H, Hultmark D. Tissue communication in a systemic immune response of Drosophila. Fly (Austin). 2016 Jul 2;10(3):115-22. doi: 10.1080/19336934.2016.1182269. Epub 2016 Apr 26. PMID 27116253; PMCID: PMC4970531.
 Yang H, Hultmark D. Drosophila muscles regulate the immune response against wasp infection via carbohydrate metabolism. Sci Rep. 2017 Nov 16;7(1):15713. doi: 10.1038/s41598-017-15940-2. PMID 29146985; PMCID: PMC5691183.

References

Fellows of the American Association for the Advancement of Science
Swedish biologists
Academic staff of Umeå University
Living people
Year of birth missing (living people)